Françoise Moréchand (born March 29, 1936) is a French TV personality in Japan and an author. Moréchand was one of the first foreigners to appear as foreign tarento on Japanese TV in 1964.

Early life and education 
Moréchand's father was an engineer at a steel factory and her mother was a French instructor at the École des Beaux-Arts. During World War II, the family moved from Paris to Toulouse. They returned to Paris just before the liberation of Paris in August 1944. After graduating from the Collège Sévigné in Japanese and Eastern Languages, Moréchand wanted to become a Chinese or Russian interpreter. Instead she went to Tokyo in 1958 with her first husband Guy Moréchand, an anthropologist. She is the mother of Agata Moréchand.

Her father Jean Marie was an engineer diplomed from École Nationale des Arts et Métiers, promotion Paris 1914.

Career 
In 1964 for the Tokyo Olympics, she worked for NHK television. In 1974, Chanel entrusted her with the management of its cosmetics division in Japan.  During this period of time, she met her current husband, Tatsuji Nagataki, an author and an authority on French culture and arts. Moréchand became a Japanese television star, a fashion specialist, an author, and a professor of comparative cultures at Kyoritsu University. She is a consultant and lecturer at the 21st Century Museum of Contemporary Art, Kanazawa. 

She also works as an adviser for French Foreign Trade.

Publications 
As of 2019, Moréchand has authored 33 works, published variously in Japanese, French, and Chinese, which are held in 65 libraries internationally, including the National Diet Library, Harvard College Library, the New York Public Library System, the University of Chicago Library, and the Université Charles de Gaulle. Her most widely held book is La Gaïjine, and Le chic, c'est chic  has sold over a million copies.

Selected books 

 Moréchand, Françoise. 1976. Le chic, c'est chic.
 Moréchand, Françoise. 1978. Eregansutte nani.
 Moréchand, Françoise. 1984. Ii onna wa ryōri ga wakaru: Parijennu wa kuishinbō. Tōkyō: KK Besuto Serāzu
 Morechand, Francoise. 1987. Furansuryū kaji no tanoshimikata. Tōkyō: Besutoserāzu.
Moréchand-Nagataki, Françoise, and Carol-Anne De Carolis. 1990. La Gaïjine. Paris: R. Laffont.
Moréchand, Françoise. 1996. Moreshan no gekijo nikki.

Awards 
In 2009, Moréchand was awarded the Legion of Honour from France. In 2014, the French ambassador to Japan presented her with the insignia of Commander in the National Order of Merit, for "devoting herself for fifty years to communicate with the Japanese and the French in order to discover the riches of each of these cultures".

References

External links 
  (video, 3:26)

Living people
1936 births
Expatriate television personalities in Japan
French expatriates in Japan